Einar Joachim Wøhni (7 May 1920, in Lebesby – 14 February 1987) was a Norwegian politician for the Labour Party.

He was elected to the Norwegian Parliament from Troms in 1961, but was not re-elected in 1965. He was the Minister of Agriculture from April 1960 to August 1963 during the third cabinet Gerhardsen. During the period he was replaced in the Norwegian Parliament by Hanna Berg Angell.

On the local level he was a member of Kvæfjord municipality council from 1955 to 1959.

References

1920 births
1987 deaths
People from Lebesby
Ministers of Agriculture and Food of Norway
Members of the Storting
Labour Party (Norway) politicians
Troms politicians
20th-century Norwegian politicians